Scuttle shake (sometimes called cowl shake in the US) is the term used for the phenomenon experienced in many convertible or open top automobiles where, due to lower structural rigidity caused by the lack of a roof, the middle section of the chassis flexes, causing the bulkhead in front of the passenger compartment to move and vibrate when the vehicle is subject to uneven road surfaces. Passengers feel it as a noticeable vibration and shudder.

References

Vehicle technology